Ramkrishna Suryabhan Gavai (30 October 1929 – 25 July 2015), popularly known as Dadasaheb Gavai, was an Indian politician, social activist, senior leader of the Ambedkarite movement, and founder of the Republican Party of India (Gavai). He was the President of Ambedkar's ideological party Republican Party of India, through this party, he did many works in political and social fields. Gavai also worked with Babasaheb Ambedkar, a polymath and the father of the republic of India. He was the Governor of the three states of Bihar, Sikkim and Kerala, as well as he has served in both houses of the Indian Parliament, the Lok Sabha and the Rajya Sabha. Gavai was a 30-year member (MLC) of the Maharashtra Legislative Council during which he served on the posts of the chairman, the deputy chairman, and the Opposition leader of the council.

Life and career
Gavai was born in 1929 at Daryapur, Amravati. He was an Ambedkarite and Buddhist. An agriculturist by profession and an avid wrestler, Gavai was from the state of Maharashtra. From 1964 to 1994, he was a member of the Maharashtra Legislative Council; during that time, he was Deputy Chairman of the Legislative Council from 1968 to 1978, chairman from 1978 to 1984, and twice Leader of the Opposition of the Legislative Council from 1986 to 1988 and from 1990 to 1991.

In 1998, Gavai was elected to the 12th Lok Sabha from Amravati. He was member of Rajya Sabha from Maharashtra State April 2000 until April 2006. In June 2006 he became the Governor of Bihar. He was the acting Governor of Sikkim  from 13 July 2006 to 12 August 2006. On 26 June 2008, Gavai was instead appointed Governor of Kerala, switching posts with Kerala Governor R. L. Bhatia. He was sworn in as Governor of Kerala on 10 July 2008.

Gavai was a recipient of the Kusta Mitra Award, as well as the National Integration awards for peace and harmony. He was President of Dr. Babasaheb Ambedkar Smarak Samiti, Deeksha Bhoomi, Nagpur and Dr. Babasaheb Ambedkar Shikshan Prasarak Mandal, Amravati. He died on 25 July 2015 at Nagpur. He is survived by wife Kamaltai and two sons Bhushan Gavai, a judge of the Supreme Court Of India, Rajendra Gavai, a prominent political leader and daughter Kirti.

Overruling of AG's advice in Lavalin case

On 7 June 2009, Gavai gave the Central Bureau of Investigation permission to prosecute CPI(M) Kerala State Secretary and former Kerala Electricity Minister Pinarayi Vijayan in the SNC-Lavalin case. This became controversial as he ignored the advice of the Advocate General not to allow the CBI to prosecute Vijayan. The CPI(M) termed Gavai's decision as unfortunate and politically motivated, whereas the opposition parties of the state, including Indian National Congress, welcomed the governor's decision.

References

External links

 Profile on Bihar Govt web site

1929 births
2015 deaths
Members of the Maharashtra Legislative Council
Governors of Sikkim
Governors of Bihar
Governors of Kerala
India MPs 1998–1999
Republican Party of India politicians
Rajya Sabha members from Maharashtra
Lok Sabha members from Maharashtra
People from Amravati district
Leaders of the Opposition in the Maharashtra Legislative Council
Chairs of the Maharashtra Legislative Council
Indian Buddhists
Marathi-language writers
Buddhist activists
20th-century Buddhists
21st-century Buddhists
Converts to Buddhism from Hinduism